A Balcony in Paris (French: Un balcon à Paris) is an oil-on-canvas painting by the French Impressionist painter Gustave Caillebotte. It was completed c. 1880–1881. The dimensions of the painting are 55.2 by 39 centimeters. It is housed in a private collection.

Description
This painting is one of several by Caillebotte in which an urban street, viewed from a balcony, is seen through the spaces of an ornate iron grill in the foreground, differentiating the space of the street from the interior of his bourgeois home, 31 boulevard Haussmann in Paris. The motif may have been inspired by similar juxtapositions seen in many Japanese ukiyo-e prints.

References

1881 paintings
Paintings by Gustave Caillebotte